Trotter may refer to:

Places
 Trotters, North Dakota, an unincorporated community in Golden Valley County, United States
 Trotters Gorge, New Zealand

People with the surname Trotter

Groups
 Clan Trotter, a Lowland Scottish clan

Individuals
 Alessandro Trotter (1874–1967), Italian naturalist known by the botanical author abbreviation "Trotter"
 Alex Trotter (1893–1948), English footballer who played on the left wing
 Alys Fane Trotter (1860s–1961), Irish poet and artist
 Ann Trotter (1932–2022), New Zealand historian
 Barrie Trotter (born 1960), Australian rules footballer
 Barrett Trotter (born 1989), American football quarterback
 Bill Trotter (1908–1984), Major League Baseball pitcher
 Brian Trotter, British philatelist
 Brock Trotter (born 1987), Canadian ice hockey centre
 Charles Trotter (1923–2003), Kenyan sports shooter
 Charlie Trotter (1959–2013), American chef and restaurateur
 Chris Trotter (born 1956), New Zealand political commentator, editor and speaker
 Christopher Trotter (born 1967), Australian sculptor
 David Trotter (born 1986), Australian rules footballer
 DeeDee Trotter (born 1982), African American track and field athlete
 Donne Trotter (born 1950), American state senator for Illinois
 Edward Trotter (disambiguation)
 Fred Robert Trotter (1861–1934), Canadian farmer and politician
 Gerald Trotter (1871–1945), British Army officer and courtier
 Geraldine Pindell Trotter (1873–1918), American civil rights activist & editor, wife of Monroe Trotter below
 Gideon Trotter (born 1992), South African sprinter
 Hale Trotter (1931–2022), Canadian-American mathematician
 Harry Trotter (1890–1954), American football coach
 Henry Trotter (disambiguation)
 India Trotter (born 1985), American soccer player
 Jake Trotter, American sports columnist and author
 James Trotter (disambiguation)
 Dame Janet Trotter (born 1943), Vice-chancellor of the University of Gloucestershire
 Jeremiah Trotter (born 1977), African-American college and National Football League player
 Jimmy Trotter (1899–1984), English football player and manager
 Joe Trotter (born 1963), American actor and comedian
 Joe William Trotter, Jr., an American historian currently the Giant Eagle Professor of History and Social Justice at Carnegie Mellon University
 John Trotter (disambiguation)
 Kate Trotter (born 1953), Canadian actress
 Keith Trotter (born 1962), English cricketer
 Liam Trotter (born 1988), English footballer
 Lilias Trotter (1853–1928), artist and christian missionary to Algeria
 Mel Trotter (1870–1940), American fundamentalist missionary
 Michael Trotter (born 1969), English footballer
 Monroe Trotter also known as William Monroe Trotter (1872–1934), American newspaper editor & NAACP co-founder, husband of Geraldine Pindell Trotter above
 Sir Neville Trotter (born 1932), British retired Conservative politician
 Obie Trotter (born 1984), basketball player
 Percy Trotter (1883–1959), Australian rules footballer
 Peter Trotter (1956–2014), Australian Paralympic wheelchair racer
 Rick Trotter, American public address announcer for the Memphis Grizzlies
 Robert Trotter (1930–2013), Scottish actor, director, and photographer
 Sir Ron Trotter (1927–2010), New Zealand businessman
 Sonnie Trotter (born 1979), Canadian climber
 Steve Trotter (born 1963), stunt performer
 Tariq Trotter (born 1971), American hip-hop artist known as Black Thought
 Terry Trotter, American studio pianist
 Thomas Trotter, British concert organist
 Thomas Trotter (physician) (1760–1832), Royal Navy physician and reformer and a critic of the slave trade
 Thomas Trotter (trade unionist) (1871–1932), executive of the Miners' Federation of Great Britain
 Tracy Trotter, American cinematographer
 Virginia Trotter (1921–1998), Assistant Secretary of Education
 Wilfred Trotter (1872–1939), British surgeon, a pioneer in neurosurgery, and social psychologist
 William Trotter (disambiguation)
 Willie Trotter (born 1959), English post-punk musician

Fictional characters
 Trotter (Lord of the Rings), early name of Aragorn, a character of J.R.R. Tolkien's The Lord of the Rings
 Barry Trotter, main character of three parodies of the Harry Potter series, written by Michael Gerber
 Evie Trotter, heroine of a trilogy by Catherine Cookson
 James Henry Trotter, title character of Roald Dahl's James and the Giant Peach
 Job Trotter, character in Dickens's The Pickwick Papers
 Louisa Trotter, heroine of the British series The Duchess of Duke Street
 Trotter family, from the British soap Only Fools and Horses

Sports
 Harlem Globetrotters, an American exhibition basketball team
 Trotter (horse), a horse trained for harness racing
 The Trotters, the nickname of English football team Bolton Wanderers F.C.
 St. Louis Trotters, an American team in the Independent Basketball Association

Other uses
 Trotters, the feet of an ungulate, especially when used for food
 Cow's trotters, the feet of cattle
 Pig's trotters, the feet of pigs
 Sheep's trotters, the feet of sheep or lambs
 Trotter (locomotive), an 1834 steam locomotive of the Dundee and Newtyle Railway

See also
 Trotta (disambiguation)
 Trotter Prize (disambiguation)